The Spikers’ Turf Reinforced Open Conference was the 3rd conference of the Spikers' Turf that started on October 10, 2015 at the Filoil Flying V Arena in San Juan.

Tournament Format

Preliminaries (PL)
Teams will play a single round robin format.
 The TOP 4 TEAMS will advance to the semi-finals (SF) round.
 The bottom two (2) teams will be eliminated from the tournament.

Semi-finals (SF)
The top four teams at the end of the single-round eliminations will advance to semifinals, with the top two earning a twice-to-beat advantage.
 Semi-finals series: Rank 1 vs Rank 4 and Rank 2 vs Rank 3
 Top two (2) SF teams will compete for GOLD.
 Bottom two (2) SF teams will compete for BRONZE.

Finals
The battle for GOLD and the battle for BRONZE will both follow the best-of-three format, provided:
 If the battle for GOLD ends in two (2) matches (2-0), then there will no longer be a Game 3 for either GOLD or Bronze. A tie in BRONZE (1-1) will be resolve using FIVB rules.
 A tie in the series for GOLD (1-1) after Game 2 will be broken in a Game 3, regardless of the result of the series in BRONZE.

Participating Teams

Conference Line-up

Preliminaries

|}

Match Result 

|}

Semifinals Round
 Ranking is based from the preliminary round.

Rank 1 vs Rank 4
* Air Force Air Men (Rank #1) had the twice-to-beat advantage

|}

Rank 2 vs Rank 3
* Cignal HD Spikers (Rank #2) had the twice-to-beat advantage

|}

Finals

Battle for Bronze

Battle for Gold

Awards

Most Valuable Player (Finals)
 Edward Ybañez (Cignal)
Most Valuable Player (Conference)
 Mark Gil Alfafara (PLDT)
Best Setter
 Glacy Ralph Diezmo (Cignal)
Best  Outside Spikers
 Mark Gil Alfafara (PLDT)
 Nur Amid Madsairi (Navy)

Best Middle Blockers
 Peter Den Mar Torres (PLDT)
 Reyson Fuentes (Air Force)
Best Opposite Spiker
 Reuben Inaudito (Air Force)
Best Libero
 Sandy Montero (Cignal)

Final standings

 Note: 
 (c) – Team Captain
 (L) – Libero

Venue
Filoil Flying V Arena, San Juan

External links
 www.spikersturf.com/ - Official website

See also
 Shakey's V-League 12th Season Reinforced Open Conference

References

Spikers' Turf
2015 in Philippine sport